Chimmanchod  also spelled       chimmanchoda  is a village in the southern state of Karnataka, India It is located in the Chincholi taluk of Kalaburagi district in Karnataka It's Famous For Many Historical Places And Dam

Demographics
 India census, Chimmanchod had a population of 9940 with 5450 males and 4490 females.

See also
 Gulbarga
 Districts of Karnataka

References

External links
 http://Gulbarga.nic.in/

Villages in Kalaburagi district